Herbert Ernest Bates  (16 May 1905 – 29 January 1974), better known as H. E. Bates, was an English writer. His best-known works include Love for Lydia, The Darling Buds of May, and My Uncle Silas.

Early life
H.E. Bates was born on 16 May 1905 in Rushden, Northamptonshire, and educated at Kettering Grammar School. After the end of school, he worked as a reporter and a warehouse clerk.

Career
Typically, Bates' best-known works are set in the English countryside, particularly the Midlands including his native Northamptonshire and the 'Garden of England', Kent, the setting for The Darling Buds of May. Bates was partial to taking long walks around the Northamptonshire countryside and this often provided the inspiration for his stories. His love for the countryside is exemplified in two volumes of essays, Through the Woods and Down the River. Both have been reprinted numerous times.

Bates discarded his first novel, written when he was in his late teenage years, but his second, and the first to be published, The Two Sisters, was inspired by one of his midnight walks, which took him to the small village of Farndish. There, late at night, he saw a light burning in a cottage window and it was this that triggered the story. At this time, he was working briefly for the local newspaper in Wellingborough, a job which he hated, and then later at a local shoe-making warehouse, where he had time to write; in fact the whole of this first novel was written there. This was sent to, and rejected by, eight or nine publishers until Jonathan Cape accepted it on the advice of its respected Reader, Edward Garnett. Bates was then twenty years old.

More novels, collections of short stories, essays, and articles followed, but did not pay well.

World War II short stories
During World War II, he was commissioned into the Royal Air Force solely to write short stories. The Air Ministry realised that it might create more favorable public sentiment by emphasizing stories about the people fighting the war, rather than facts. The stories were published originally in the News Chronicle with the pseudonym "Flying Officer X". Later they were published in book form as The Greatest People in the World and Other Stories and How Sleep the Brave and Other Stories. His first financial success was Fair Stood the Wind for France. After a posting to the Far East, this was followed by two novels about Burma, The Purple Plain in 1947 and The Jacaranda Tree, and one set in India, The Scarlet Sword.

He was also commissioned by the Air Ministry to write The Battle of the Flying Bomb, but because of various disagreements within the government, it was cancelled, and then publication was banned for 30 years. It eventually was discovered by Bob Ogley and published during 1994 with the title Flying Bombs over England. Another commission which has still to be published is Night Interception Battle concerning the difficulty of tracking enemy aircraft at night.

Post-war work
Other novels followed after the war; he averaged about one novel and a collection of short stories a year, which was considered very productive at the time. These included The Feast of July and Love for Lydia. His most popular creation was the Larkin family in The Darling Buds of May. Pop Larkin and his family were inspired by a person seen in a local shop in Kent by Bates and his family when on holiday. The man (probably Wiltshire trader William Dell, also on holiday) had a huge wad of rubber-banded bank notes and proceeded to treat his trailer load of children with Easter eggs and ice creams. Other characters were modelled on friends and acquaintances of Bates, such as Iris Snow (a parody of Iris Murdoch) and the Brigadier who was modelled on the father of John Bayley, Murdoch's husband.

The television adaptation, produced after his death by his son Richard and based on these stories, was a tremendous success. It is also the source of the American movie The Mating Game. The My Uncle Silas stories were also made into a UK television series from 2000 to 2003. Many other stories were adapted to TV and others to movies, the most renowned being The Purple Plain in 1954 and The Triple Echo; Bates also worked on other movie scripts. In 2020 ITV commissioned a new television series of The Darling Buds of May, with the title The Larkins starring Bradley Walsh, Joanna Scanlan, Sabrina Bartlett and Tok Stephen The first episode aired in October 2021.

Personal life
In 1931, he married Madge Cox, who lived two streets away from him in his native Rushden. They relocated to the village of Little Chart in Kent and bought an old granary and this together with an acre of garden they converted into a home. Bates was a keen and knowledgeable gardener who wrote many books on flowers. The Granary remained their home for the whole of their married life.

They had two sons and two daughters: Ann, Judith, Richard and Jonathan. Jonathan Bates was nominated for an Academy Award for his sound work on the 1982 movie Gandhi. Richard became a television producer,. Bates's granddaughter, Victoria Wicks is an actor and script consultant.

Death and honours
Bates died on 29 January 1974 in Canterbury, Kent, aged 68. A prolific and successful author, his greatest success was posthumous, with the television adaptations of his stories The Darling Buds of May and its sequels as well as adaptations of My Uncle Silas, A Moment in Time, Fair Stood the Wind for France and Love for Lydia. In his home town of Rushden, H.E. Bates has a road named after him to the west of the town, leading to the local leisure centre. His archive is held at the Harry Ransom Center at the University of Texas at Austin.

After Bates' death Madge relocated to a bungalow, which had originally been a cow byre, next to the Granary. She died in 2004 at the age of 95.

Bibliography

Novels
 The Two Sisters (1926)
 Catherine Foster (1929)
 Charlotte's Row (1931)
 The Fallow Land (1932)
 The Poacher (1935)
 A House of Women (1936)
 Spella Ho (1938)
 Fair Stood the Wind for France (1944)
 The Cruise of the Breadwinner (1946)
 The Purple Plain (1947)
 Dear Life (1949)
 The Jacaranda Tree (1949)
 The Scarlet Sword (1950)
 The Grass God (1951)
 Love for Lydia (1952)
 The Feast of July (1954)
 The Sleepless Moon (1956)
 A Crown of Wild Myrtle (1962)
 A Moment in Time (1964)
 The Distant Horns of Summer (1967)
 The Triple Echo (1970)

Pop Larkin series
 The Darling Buds of May (1958)
 A Breath of French Air (1959)
 When the Green Woods Laugh (1960)
 Oh! To be in England (1963)
 A Little of What You Fancy (1970)

Short stories
 The Seekers (1926)
 The Spring Song and in View of the Fact That (1927)
 Day's End (1928)
 Alexander (1929)
 The Tree (1930)
 The Hessian Prisoner (1930)
 A Threshing Day for Esther (1930)
 Charlotte Esmond (1930) Republished as Mrs Esmond's Life (1931)
 A German Idyll (1932)
 Sally Go Round the Moon (1932)
 The Black Boxer (1932)
 The Story Without an End (1932)
 The House with the Apricot (1933)
 Time (1933)
 The Lily (1933)
 The Woman who had Imagination (1934)
 The Duet (1935)
 The Mill (1935)
 The Ox (1939)
 I Am Not Myself (1939)
 The Beauty of the Dead (1940)
 Bride Comes to Evensford (1943)
 Colonel Julien (1951)
 The Delicate Nature (1953)
 Dulcima (1953)
 The Nature of Love (1953)
 The Daffodil Sky (1955)
 Summer in Salander (1955)
 The Grapes of Paradise (1956)
 The Queen of Spain Fritillary (1956)
 Death of a Huntsman (1957)
 A Great Day for Bonzo (1957)
 A Month by the Lake (1957)
 Night Run to the West (1957)
 A Prospect of Orchards (1957)
 The White Wind (1957)
 An Aspidistra in Babylon (1959)
 The Watercress Girl (1959)
 Mr Featherstone Takes a Ride (1961)
 Now Sleeps the Crimson Petal (1961)
 The Day of the Tortoise (1961)
 The Ring of Truth (1961)
 The Quiet Girl (1962)
 The World is Too Much With Us (1962)
 The Fabulous Mrs V (1964)
 The Simple Life (1967)
 The Chords of Youth (1968)
 The Four Beauties (1968)
 The White Admiral (1968)
 The Dam (1971)
 The Man Who Loved Squirrels (1971)
 The Song of the Wren (1972)
 The Yellow Meads of Asphodel (1976)

Short story collections
 Day's End and Other Stories (1928)
 Seven Tales and Alexander (1929)
 The Black Boxer Tales (1932)
 The Woman Who Had Imagination and Other Stories (1934)
 Thirty Tales (1934)
 Cut and Come Again (1935)
 Something Short and Sweet (1937)
 Country Tales (1938)
 The Flying Goat (1939)
 The Beauty of the Dead and Other Stories (1940)
 Thirty-One Selected Tales (1947)
 The Bride Comes to Evensford and Other Tales (1949)
 Colonel Julian and Other Stories (1951)
 Twenty Tales (1951)
 Selected Short Stories of H.E. Bates (1951)
 The Daffodil Sky (1955)
 Selected Stories (1957)
 The Watercress Girl (1959)
 An Aspidistra in Babylon (1960)
 Now Sleeps the Crimson Petal and Other Stories (1961)
 The Golden Oriole (1962)
 Seven by Five (1963)
 The Fabulous Mrs V (1964)
 The Wedding Party (1965)
 The Wild Cherry Tree (1968)
 The Song of the Wren (1972)
 The Good Corn and other Stories (1974)
 A Party for the Girls (1988)
 Love in a Wych Elm and Other Stories (2009)

Uncle Silas series
 My Uncle Silas (1939)
 Sugar for the Horse (1957)

Flying Officer X series
 The Greatest People in the World and Other Stories (1942)
 How Sleep the Brave and Other Stories (1943)
 Something in the Air (1944)
 The Stories of Flying Officer 'X''' (1952)

Drama
 The Last Bread (1926) (a play in one act)
 The Day of Glory (1945) (a play in three acts)

Essays and non-fiction
 Flowers and Faces (1935)
 Through the Woods (1936)
 Down the River (1937)
 The Seasons & The Gardener (1940)
 In the Heart of the Country (1942)
 O More Than Happy Countryman (1943)
 War Pictures by British Artists (1943)
 Country Life (1943)
 There's Freedom in the Air (1944)
 The W.A.A.F in Action (1944)
 Flying Bombs over England (1945) Also published as "The Battle of the Flying Bomb."
 The Tinkers of Elstow (1946)
 The Country Heart (1949)
 Fawley Achievement (1951)
 The Country of White Clover (1952)
 Edward Garnett (1950)
 A Love of Flowers (1971)
 A Fountain of Flowers (1974)

Criticism
 The Modern Short Story (1942)

Books for children
 The Seekers (1926)
 The Seasons & The Gardener (1940)
 Achilles the Donkey (1962)
 Achilles and Diana (1963)
 Achilles and the Twins (1964)
 The White Admiral (1968)

Autobiography
 The Vanished World (1969)
 The Blossoming World (1971)
 The World in Ripeness (1972)

References to H.E. Bates
 Bates's novel Love for Lydia served as an inspiration for Donna Lewis's 1996 smash hit "I Love You Always Forever".
 Literary study of his works: Dennis Vannatta, H.E. Bates (Twayne's English Authors Series). Boston: Twayne Publishers, 1983. 
 Bates' idyllic depiction of rural Britain is referred to by the character 'I' in cult British comedy Withnail & I''
 His short story 'The Mill' featured as the extract in the first paper of the AQA English Language GCSE in 2019.

Notes

Eads, Peter, 1990, H.E.BATES, A Bibliographical Study, St. Paul's Bibliographies, Winchester, Hampshire, Omnigraphics, Detroit 1990 

Eads, Peter, 2007, H.E.BATES, A Bibliographical Study, Oak Knoll Press & British Library,  (Oak Knoll Press)  (The British Library)

Eads, Peter, 1990, Give Them Their Life, The Poetry of H.E. Bates, Evensford Productions Ltd, 

Eads, Peter, 1995, The Life and Times of H.E.Bates, Northamptonshire County Council Libraries and Information Service,

External links
 Official website
 H. E. Bates Papers at the Harry Ransom Center
 The Vanished World of H. E. Bates
 
 
 

1905 births
1974 deaths
English nature writers
English short story writers
People from Rushden
Bates, Herbert Ernest
20th-century English novelists
20th-century British short story writers
People from Little Chart
Royal Air Force personnel of World War II
Royal Air Force officers